Montgomery Peak is a mountain in the White Mountains of California, USA. Boundary Peak has a prominence of less than 300 feet. Montgomery can be climbed in combination with Boundary Peak. The two peaks are in the Inyo National Forest and White Mountains Wilderness. Montgomery Peak is in Inyo County (California), and Boundary Peak is in Esmeralda County, in Nevada.

References 

Mountains of Mono County, California
White Mountains (California)
Inyo National Forest
Mountains of Northern California